European City of the Reformation (German: Reformationsstadt Europas French: Cité européenne de la Réforme) is a honorific title bestowed upon European cities and towns which played an important role during the history of the Reformation by the Community of Protestant Churches in Europe.

Protestant Reformation